The Murchison Sound  is a sound in the Avannaata municipality, NW Greenland. It was named after Scottish geologist Roderick Murchison (1792 – 1871).

Geography
It is a broad channel that runs roughly from northwest to southeast between the mouth of the Inglefield Fjord and Baffin Bay. It is 51.8 km wide between Cape Robertson and Hakluyt Island and its minimum width is 14 km. 

The Murchison Sound separates Prudhoe Land and Piulip Nuna —part of the Greenland mainland— to the north from Kiatak (Northumberland Island) and Qeqertarsuaq (Herbert Island) to the south with Cape Cleveland on the northern shore. On the south side of the islands the Whale Sound leads from the Baffin Bay to the Inglefield Fjord.
 
The Robertson Fjord and the MacCormick Fjord have their mouths on the northern side of the sound.

References

External links 
Sunrise, Murchison Sund, Qeqertarsuaq, Northwest Greenland
Explanatory notes to the Geological map of Greenland

Sounds of North America
Straits of Greenland
Bodies of water of Baffin Bay